The Ukrainian Catholic Archiepiscopal Exarchate of Krym was established on 13 February 2014 from the Ukrainian Catholic Archiepiscopal Exarchate of Odesa – Crimea. 

Because of the Annexation of Crimea by the Russian Federation in March 2014 some part of faithful and clergy left the Exarchate and Exarch was not appointed. Currently Exarchate is governing by Archiepiscopal Administrator from Odesa.

This is one from the only five Archiepiscopal Exarchates which exist in the world, all part of the particular Ukrainian Greek Catholic Church and following the Byzantine Ukrainian Rite.

Status as Archiepiscopal Exarchate 

As Major Archbishops have similar authority to that of Patriarchs, Archiepiscopal Exarchates similarly have roughly the same status in canon law as Patriarchal Exarchates.

References

External links
 Profile at Catholic Hierarchy 
  GCatholic.org information page about the Archiepiscopal Exarchate

Ukrainian Greek Catholic Church
Krym